Rubén Martínez Puente (1941/2 – 24 July 2021) was a Cuban military officer and politician who served in the National Assembly of People's Power.

References

1940s births
2021 deaths
Cuban politicians